

Ælfric (died ) was a medieval Bishop of Hereford. He was consecrated in either 934 or between 937 and 940 and died either between 949 and 958 or in 971.

Notes

Citations

References

External links
 

Bishops of Hereford
10th-century English bishops
960 deaths